TKS (Tecalemit-Kilfrost-Sheepbridge Stokes) was a British aerospace manufacturer formed in 1942 to develop an ice protection system that could be compatible with armoured leading edges on military aircraft.

The TKS company was a collaboration between Tecalemit Ltd, which was a company specialising in aircraft oil systems, filters, etc, Kilfrost Ltd, which specialised in anti-icing pastes for aircraft, and Sheepbridge Stokes Ltd, who specialised in iron castings, particularly such items as fuel and oil pump rotors.

The TKS system utilised a de-icing fluid that was made to seep through a porous strip along the wing and tail surface leading edges where it would then be spread out by the airflow, an early example of the TKS system's use being on the Avro Shackleton maritime patrol aircraft. Other aircraft so-equipped were the Vickers Viking, Handley Page Hermes, Handley Page Hastings, Avro Tudor, and de Havilland Dove.

References

External links
 "De-icing for To-Day" a 1946 Flight article on the TKS system

Aircraft component manufacturers of the United Kingdom
1942 establishments in England
British companies established in 1942
Companies based in Northumberland
Manufacturing companies established in 1942
Science and technology in Northumberland